The Mountain East Conference men's basketball tournament is the annual conference basketball championship tournament for the Mountain East Conference. The tournament has been held annually since the MEC's establishment in 2013, with the first tournament taking place in 2014. It is a single-elimination tournament and seeding is based on regular season records.

From 2014 to 2018, the tournament was hosted by the Charleston Civic Center in Charleston, West Virginia.  Following several years of low attendance, the league announce it would move the event to the Wheeling Civic Center for at least 2019 and 2020.

The winner, declared conference champion, receives the conference's automatic bid to the NCAA Division II men's basketball tournament.

Results

Championship records

 Shepherd, Urbana, and UVA Wise never qualified for the tournament finals as MEC members.
 Alderson Broaddus, Davis & Elkins, Frostburg State,  West Virginia State, and West Virginia Wesleyan have yet to reach a tournament final.

See also
 Mountain East Conference women's basketball tournament

References

NCAA Division II men's basketball conference tournaments
Basketball Tournament, Men's
Recurring sporting events established in 2014